Ulmi is a commune in Dâmbovița County, Muntenia, Romania. It is composed of eight villages: Colanu, Dimoiu, Dumbrava, Matraca, Nisipurile, Udrești, Ulmi and Viișoara.

References

Communes in Dâmbovița County
Localities in Muntenia